Seafarers' Memorial is situated at the center of the Bangladesh Marine Academy campus. It is a memorial to all the Bangladesh Marine Academy cadets who lost their life at sea. International Maritime Organization (IMO) Secretary-General Efthimios E. Mitropoulos unveiled the memorial on 13 January 2011.

References

Monuments and memorials in Bangladesh
Buildings and structures in Chittagong